Noel Nutels (1913-1973) was a Brazilian physician who dedicated his life to the well-being of Brazilian Amerindians.

Biography
He was born in Ukraine in 1913 and immigrated to Pernambuco in Brazil as a youngster. He qualified in medicine in Recife in 1938 and specialized in public health.

In the 1940s he joined the Indian Service and from then on he dedicated his life to the aboriginal cause, becoming a champion of Indian rights.

He has been honored in many ways and is considered one of the fathers of the Brazilian Public Health.

References

Bibliography

1913 births
1973 deaths
Brazilian public health doctors
Brazilian people of Ukrainian-Jewish descent
Brazilian Jews
Ukrainian emigrants to Brazil
Ukrainian Jews
20th-century Brazilian physicians